Dorothy Snowden "Dar" Williams (born April 19, 1967) is an American pop folk singer-songwriter from Mount Kisco, New York. Hendrik Hertzberg of The New Yorker has described Williams as "one of America's very best singer-songwriters."

She is a frequent performer at folk festivals and has toured with such artists as Mary Chapin Carpenter, Patty Griffin, Ani DiFranco, the Nields, Shawn Colvin, Girlyman, Joan Baez, and Catie Curtis.

Early life

Williams was born in Mount Kisco, New York, and grew up in Chappaqua with two older sisters, Meredith and Julie. Her nickname "Dar" originated due to a mispronunciation of "Dorothy" by one of Williams's sisters. In a 2008 interview with WUKY radio, Dar said her parents wanted to name her Darcy, after the character in Pride and Prejudice, and that they intentionally called her "Dar-Dar", which she shortened to "Dar" in school.

In interviews, she has described her parents as "liberal and loving" people who early on encouraged a career in songwriting. Williams began playing the guitar at age nine and wrote her first song two years later. However, she was more interested in drama at the time, and majored in theater and religion at Wesleyan University.

Musical career 

Williams moved to Boston in 1990 to further explore a career in theater. She worked for a year as stage manager of the Opera Company of Boston, but on the side began to write songs, record demo tapes, and take voice lessons. In 1990, Dar recorded her first album, I Have No History, produced by Jeannie Deva and engineered by Rob Lehmann at Oak Grove Studios in Malden, Massachusetts. One year later in 1991, Dar recorded her second album, All My Heroes Are Dead, most of which was recorded at Wellspring Sound in Newton, MA. This album included Dar's song "Mark Rothko Song." The original recording of this song was later included in her third album The Honesty Room. In 1993 Williams moved to Northampton, Massachusetts. Early in Williams's music career, she opened for Joan Baez, who would make her relatively well known by recording some of her songs (Williams also dueted with Baez on Ring Them Bells). Her growing popularity has since relied heavily on community coffeehouses, public radio, and an extensive fan base on the Internet.

Williams recorded her first full album, The Honesty Room, under her own label, Burning Field Music. Guest artists included Nerissa and Katryna Nields, Max Cohen and Gideon Freudmann. The album was briefly distributed by Chicago-based Waterbug Records. Williams soon secured a licensing-and-distribution deal for Burning Field with Razor and Tie, and in 1995 reissued the album on that label, with two re-recorded bonus tracks. The record went on to become one of the top-selling independent folk albums of the year. 1996's Mortal City, also licensed and distributed with Razor and Tie, received substantial notice, partially due to the fact that it coincided with her tour with Baez. The album again featured guest appearances by the Nields sisters and Freudmann, as well as noted folk artists John Prine, Cliff Eberhardt and Lucy Kaplansky. With that success, Razor & Tie re-released The Honesty Room. By the time of her third release, End of The Summer (1997), Williams's career had gathered substantial momentum, and the album did remarkably well, given its genre and independent label status.

In 1998, Williams, Richard Shindell and Lucy Kaplansky formed the group Cry Cry Cry as a way to pay homage to some of their favorite folk artists. The band released an eponymous album of covers and toured from 1998 to 2000. In June 2017, Cry Cry Cry reunited for the first time to play at the Clearwater Festival in New York.

She has since released six more studio albums on the Razor & Tie label (The Green World (2000; which included "Spring Street", based on Spring Street in SoHo in Manhattan), The Beauty of the Rain (2003), My Better Self (2005), Promised Land (2008), Many Great Companions (2010), and In the Time of Gods (2012), as well as two live albums (Out There Live (2001) and Live at Bearsville Theater (2007)).

Williams founded the Snowden Environmental Trust and has been a part of many benefit concerts. She performed in a show at Alcatraz with Baez and the Indigo Girls, to benefit the prisoner-rights group Bread and Roses.

As someone who has toured a great deal of the time and had trouble finding suitable dining on the road, Williams was inspired to write and publish a directory of natural food stores and restaurants called The Tofu Tollbooth in 1994. In 1998 Williams co-authored a second edition with Elizabeth Zipern.

Williams wrote a book, released on September 5, 2017, titled What I Found in a Thousand Towns: A Traveling Musicians Guide to Rebuilding America's Communities – One Coffee Shop, Dog Run, & Open-Mike Night at a Time, that focuses in part on rebuilding smaller cities and larger towns in America.

Personal life

On May 4, 2002, she married Michael Robinson, an old friend from college, though they are now divorced. Their son, Stephen Gray Robinson, was born on April 24, 2004. In addition, they have an adopted daughter named Taya, who was born in Ethiopia. She resides in the Hudson Valley region of New York.

Songs

Recurrent themes in Williams's songs include religion, adolescence, gender issues, anti-commercialism, misunderstood relationships, loss, humor, and geography.

Williams' early work spoke clearly of her upbringing in 1970s and 80s suburbia – of alienation, and the hypocrisy evident in the post-WWII middle class. On the track "Anthem" on her early tape All My Heroes Are Dead, she sang, "I know there's blood in the pavement and we've turned the fields to sand."

Williams' songs often address gender typing, roles, and inequities. "You're Aging Well" on The Honesty Room discusses adolescent body image, ageism and self-loathing in detail. The song ends with the singer finding an unnamed female mentor — "the woman of voices" — who points her toward a more enlightened and mature point of view. Joan Baez covered the song in concert and later dueted with Williams on tours.

A 2001 article in The Advocate discussed Williams' popularity among LGBT people, writing that among LGBT-supportive straight songwriters, "few manage in their lyrics to dig as deeply or as authentically as... Williams does".

"When I Was a Boy", also on The Honesty Room, uses Williams' own childhood experiences as a tomboy to muse on gender roles and how they limit boys and girls, who then become limited men and women.

"The Christians and the Pagans" on Mortal City simultaneously tackles both religion and sexual orientation through a tale of a lesbian, pagan couple that chooses to spend solstice with the devout Christian uncle of one of the women, thus creating a situation where people who would oppose each other on almost every political and cultural front try to get by on pure politeness. Throughout the song, the family members begin to discover their differences need not estrange them from one another.

In an interview in 2007 on the Food Is Not Love podcast, she said that the song "February" from Mortal City is one of her songs that she likes best. She referred to the way the song "kept on evolving into, not only what I wanted to say, but what I wanted to say and didn't even know was in there." She liked the way the song "kept on breaking its own rules in a way that art is all about."

Williams' relationship with her family is hinted at through several songs, including "After All" on The Green World. The song deals mainly with her depression at the age of twenty-one, referring to it as a "winter machine that you go through" repeatedly while "everyone else is spring-bound."

Her song "As Cool As I Am" has become part of Bryn Mawr College's traditional May Day, when the song is played during the "May Hole" celebration. The song is even called an "unofficial anthem" for the school. Williams has visited the college several times to perform at concerts.

Discography

Albums, EPs, singles
 "You're Aging Well" on the album "Boston Women's Voice" (1985) rare live recording of Dar appears on a compilation of Boston Area Women artists in Cambridge, MA recorded at Christopher's Restaurant. limited edition on cassette. (Joan Baez also recorded this song in a live duet w/ Dar. It appears on Joan's "Ring Them Bells" album.) (source: Mare Streetpeople. Producer of BWV)
 I Have No History (1990 – rare album on cassette)
 All My Heroes Are Dead (1991 – rare album on cassette)
 The Honesty Room (1993)
 The Christians and the Pagans (1996 – EP)
 As Cool As I Am (1996 – EP)
 Mortal City (1996)
 End of The Summer (1997)
 What Do You Hear in These Sounds (1997, single)
 Cry Cry Cry (1998, with Richard Shindell and Lucy Kaplansky)
 The Green World (2000)
 Out There Live (2001)
 The Beauty of the Rain (2003)
 My Better Self (2005)
 Live at Bearsville Theater (2007)
 Promised Land (2008)
 It's Alright (EP) (2008)
 Many Great Companions (2010)
 In the Time of Gods (2012)
 Keeping Me Honest: The Honesty Room 20th Anniversary Concert Live (2014)
 Emerald (2015)
 The Music Hall Session (EP) (2021)
 I'll Meet You Here (2021)

Contributions
 Postcrypt: Commemorating 30 Years 1964–1994 (1995) – "The Great Unknown"
 Women Live from Mountain Stage (1996) – "When I Was a Boy"
 Hempilation 2: Free the Weed (1998) – "Play the Greed"
 Lilith Fair: A Celebration of Women in Music (1998) – "What Do You Hear in These Sounds" (recorded live during the 1997 tour)
 Badlands: A Tribute to Bruce Springsteen's Nebraska (2000) – "Highway Patrolman"
 This Bird Has Flown – A 40th Anniversary Tribute to the Beatles' Rubber Soul (2005) – "You Won't See Me"
 Born to the Breed: A Tribute to Judy Collins (2008) – "Holly Ann (The Weaver Song)"

Bibliography
 The Tofu Tollbooth (1994, co-author)
 Amalee (May 2004)
 Lights, Camera, Amalee (July 2006)
What I Found in a Thousand Towns (September 2017)
How to Write a Song That Matters (August 2022)

References

External links

1967 births
American women singer-songwriters
American women country singers
American country singer-songwriters
American folk musicians
American folk singers
Singer-songwriters from New York (state)
Living people
People from Mount Kisco, New York
Wesleyan University alumni
American alternative country singers
American folk-pop singers
Razor & Tie artists
Feminist musicians
People from Chappaqua, New York
Guitarists from New York (state)
20th-century American guitarists
21st-century American guitarists
20th-century American singers
21st-century American singers
20th-century American non-fiction writers
21st-century American non-fiction writers
American memoirists
20th-century American women singers
21st-century American women singers
Cry Cry Cry members
20th-century American women writers
21st-century American women writers
Country musicians from New York (state)
American women memoirists
Waterbug Records artists
20th-century American women guitarists
21st-century American women guitarists